Susan Lucas, better known as Soo Catwoman (often written incorrectly as Sue Catwoman), was associated with the London punk subculture that sprang up around the mid-1970s.

History
In The Filth and the Fury, Johnny Rotten singles her out among the early London punks, citing her "skill, style, and bravery".

Soo created her trademark Catwoman haircut in an Ealing barber shop in 1976. The hair around the sides and back was severely cropped close to the head with the two sides flared up to suggest the ears of a cat. Portions of the hairstyle were dyed different colours – the flared "ears" being black and the cropped parts being bleached.

Soo was pictured by Ray Stevenson posing with members of the original fans of the Sex Pistols known as the Bromley Contingent such as Siouxsie Sioux, Steven Severin and Billy Idol. While she was also associated with the Bromley Contingent by all the journalists, she later claimed not to have been a member.

Photos and likenesses of Soo Catwoman were, and remain, popular in punk rock media. She appeared in several punk documentaries and concert films. She declined to appear in Julien Temple's The Great Rock 'n' Roll Swindle and was portrayed by actress Judy Croll. She now lives in London with her son and daughter.

Filmography 
The Punk Rock Movie (1979, dir. Don Letts)
The Filth and the Fury (2000, dir. Julien Temple, VHS/NTSC)

References

External links
Early English punk
Official Soo Catwoman website

Year of birth missing (living people)
Living people
1970s fashion
Punk fashion
Women in punk
Bromley Contingent
20th-century English women
20th-century English people